Beatriz Monroy Alarcón, professionally known as Betty Monroe (born March 4, 1978) is a Mexican actress and model.

Career

Early career beginnings; 1991-2000
Betty has been quite notable for playing villainous roles in several productions. She started off her career in 1998 when she starred in the telenovela Tres veces Sofia, a TV Azteca. She played a minor role as a secretary. Later that year she later played in a telenovela, Perla that was topbilled by Silvia Navarro and Leonardo García.

2000-2003; El amor no es como lo pintan, Como en el cine,  La hija del jardinero
In 2000, she portrayed Marisela Aguilera in El amor no es como lo pintan, a telenovela by TV Azteca. In 2001, she starred in another Azteca Production Como en el cine, a telenovela that had Lorena Rojas as the leading lady. In 2003, she returned to the small screen in La hija del jardinero. She played Adreina Torres.

2004-2009; Bellezas indomables
In the year 2007, she appeared in Bellezas indomables as the  antagonist; Berenice; a vicious, calculating woman that marries a much elder man and does everything in her power to get the fortune of her husband even if she has to leave her step-daughters in the streets. The telenovela starred, Yahir, Claudia Álvarez and Tomas Goros.

2010-2014; Cielo rojo, La mujer de Judas, Corazón en condominio, Las Bravo
She made her comeback in telenovelas, starring in Cielo rojo She played Sofia a divorcee. In 2012, she played in La mujer de Judas. In 2013, she was one of the stars in Corazón en condominio.
In 2014, she made an appearance  in Las Bravo. She played Candela Milan. The telenovela had Edith González, Mauricio Islas and Saúl Lisazo

2015-present; Sueño de amor
In 2016, she has been confirmed to star in Juan Osorio's new production, Sueño de amor''. She plays Esperanza Guerrero, a loving mother of two adolescents and the main protagonist of the telenovela.

Filmography

References

External links
 

1978 births
Mexican telenovela actresses
Living people
Mexican female models
Mexican television actresses
20th-century Mexican actresses
Actresses from Guadalajara, Jalisco
21st-century Mexican actresses